Yilan County is represented in the Legislative Yuan since 2008 by one at-large single-member constituency (Yilan County Constituency). With an electorate of 357,077 persons in 2016, it is the least-represented constituency since the split of Hsinchu County Constituency.

Current district
 Yilan County

Legislators

Election results

References 

Constituencies in Taiwan
Yilan County, Taiwan